In astrodynamics, an orbiting body is any physical body that orbits a more massive one, called the primary body. The orbiting body is properly referred to as the secondary body, which is less massive than the primary body.

Under standard assumptions in astrodynamics, the barycenter of the two bodies is a focus of both orbits.

An orbiting body may be a spacecraft (i.e. an artificial satellite) or a natural satellite, such as a planet, dwarf planet, moon, moonlet, asteroid, or comet.

A system of two orbiting bodies is modeled by the Two-Body Problem and a system of three orbiting bodies is modeled by the Three-Body Problem. These problems can be generalized to an N-body problem. While there are a few analytical solutions to the n-body problem, it can be reduced to a 2-body system if the secondary body stays out of other bodies' Sphere of Influence and remains in the primary body's sphere of influence.

See also
Barycenter
Double planet
Primary (astronomy)
Satellite
Two-body problem
Three-body problem
N-body problem

References

Orbits
Astrodynamics